The BET 3-wheeler was a light five-seat passenger car introduced in 1965 by Biotechnia Ellinikon Trikyklon (BET), a small Greek vehicle manufacturer. It used a BMW  motorcycle engine. Although the type was certified, only one was built due to problems in availability of parts for further production. BET did produce, in small numbers, a number of other three-wheeler types, including trucks and a light passenger car introduced in 1973.

References 
 L.S. Skartsis and G.A. Avramidis, "Made in Greece", Typorama, Patras, Greece (2003).
 K. Bitsikokos, "Affordable cars made in Greece", Auto Bild (Hellas), issue 22, Feb 29, 2008

Cars of Greece
Cars introduced in 1965